The American singer and songwriter Donna De Lory has released ten studio albums (including one with other artists), four extended plays (EPs), two live albums, four remix albums, 18 singles (including one as a featured artist), three promotional singles and seven music videos.

Studio albums

Minor releases

Extended plays

Live albums

Remix albums

Singles

As lead artist

As a featured artist

Promotional singles

Music videos

Notes

References

External links 
 
 
 

Discographies of American artists
Pop music discographies